A Mikraot Gedolot (Great Scriptures;), often called the "Rabbinic Bible" in English, is an edition of the Hebrew Bible (in Hebrew) that generally includes three distinct elements:
 The biblical text according to the masorah in its letters, vocalization, and cantillation marks
 Aramaic Targum
 Jewish commentaries on the Bible (most common and prominent are medieval commentaries in the peshat tradition)

Numerous editions of the Mikraot Gedolot have been and continue to be published.

Commentaries 

In addition to Targum Onkelos and Rashi's commentary, the standard Jewish commentaries on the Hebrew Bible, the Mikraot Gedolot will include numerous other commentaries. For instance, the Romm publishing house edition of the Mikraot Gedolot contains the following additional commentaries:
 Targum Jonathan (For the Torah, Pseudo-Jonathan)
 Targum Yerushalmi on the Torah
 Rashbam
 Tosafot on the Torah (Daat Zekenim)
 Chaim ibn Attar (Or Hachaim)
 Abraham ibn Ezra
 David Kimhi (Rada"k)
 Nachmanides
 Gersonides
 Jacob ben Asher (Ba'al Haturim)
 Obadiah ben Jacob Sforno
 Shabbethai Bass (Siftei Chakhamim)
 Obadiah of Bertinoro (Emer Neka)
 Shlomo Ephraim Luntschitz (Kli Yakar)
 Don Isaac Abrabanel
 Joseph Kara

Newer editions often include Baruch Halevi Epstein's Torah Temimah and other medieval commentaries, or more modern commentaries such as Malbim. Special editions exist of supercommentaries on Rashi or commentaries and targumim not included in older editions. Bomberg also included the Masoretic notes on the biblical text, but no modern edition does.

Editions of the Bomberg Mikraot Gedolot

First published in 1516–17 by Daniel Bomberg in Venice, the Mikraot Gedolot was edited by Felix Pratensis. The second edition was edited by the masoretic scholar Yaakov ben Hayyim in 1525.

All of its elements – text, masorah, Targum, and commentaries were based upon the manuscripts that Ben Hayyim had at hand (although he did not always have access to the best ones according to some, Ginsburg and some others argued that it was a good representation of the Ben Asher text).

The Mikraot Gedolot of Ben Hayyim, though hailed as an extraordinary achievement, was riddled with thousands of technical errors. Objections were also raised by the Jewish readership, based on the fact that the very first printing of the Mikra'ot Gedolot was edited by Felix Pratensis, a Jew converted to Christianity. Furthermore, Bomberg, a Christian, had requested an imprimatur from the Pope. Such facts were not compatible with the supposed Jewish nature of the work; Bomberg had to produce a fresh edition under the direction of acceptable Jewish editors. Nevertheless, this first edition served as the textual model for nearly all later editions until modern times. With regard to the biblical text, many of Ben Hayyim's errors were later corrected by Menahem Lonzano and Shlomo Yedidiah Norzi.

The Mikraot Gedolot of Ben Hayyim served as the source for the Hebrew Bible translation in the King James Version of the Bible in 1611 and the Spanish Reina-Valera translation.

A scholarly reprint of the 1525 Ben-Hayyim Venice edition was published in 1972 by Moshe Goshen-Gottstein.

Recent printed editions

Most editions until the last few decades, and many editions even today, are reprints of or based on late nineteenth century Eastern European editions, which are in turn based more or less on the Ben Hayyim edition described above.

In the last generation fresh editions of the Mikraot Gedolot have been published, based directly on manuscript evidence, principally (for the biblical text and Masoretic notes) the Keter Aram Tzova, the manuscript of the Tanakh kept by the Jews of Aleppo.  These also have improved texts of the commentaries based on ancient manuscripts.  Three of these editions are:
 the Bar Ilan Mikraot Gedolot ha-Keter, ed. Menaḥem Cohen (complete in 21 volumes: Genesis (2 vols.), Exodus (2 vols.), Leviticus, Numbers, Deuteronomy, Joshua & Judges (1 vol.), Samuel, Kings, Isaiah, Jeremiah, Ezekiel, Minor Prophets, Psalms (2 vols.), Proverbs, Job, Five Megillot (1 vol.)), Daniel-Ezra-Nehemiah, Chronicles.
 Torat Hayim, published by Mosad ha-Rav Kook (15 vols thus far: Torah, Psalms, Proverbs, and five Megillot, plus several non-biblical texts).
 Chorev Mikraot Gedolot, published by Hotzaat Chorev (now complete).
 Mikraot Gedolot, published by ArtScroll Mesorah

References

Sources 

 Menaḥem Cohen, "Introduction to the Haketer edition," in Mikra'ot Gedolot Haketer: A revised and augmented scientific edition of "Mikra'ot Gedolot" based on the Aleppo Codex and Early Medieval MSS (Bar-Ilan University Press, 1992).

External links

  Mikraot Gedolot – Haketer (Bar Ilan University website)
  Reconstructing the Bible (haaretz.com website)

Wikimedia projects 

Wikisource's Mikraot Gedolot is available in Hebrew (has the most content) and English.

Editions available online

 The Second Rabbinic Bible (Mikra'ot Gdolot)
 Mikraot Gedolot AlHaTorah – free customizable online edition, including up to 26 different commentators, some newly published or in critical editions
 The Second Rabbinic Bible (Mikraot Gedolot) (מקראות גדולות) Volume I, Yaakov ben Hayyim, 1524; digital copy: Yaakov ben Hayyim, 1524: The Second Rabbinic Bible (Genesis through Deuteronomy only)
 1912 Vilna Edition
 Volume I (Genesis)
 Volume II (Exodus)
 Volume III (Leviticus)
 Volume IV (Numbers)
 Volume V (Deuteronomy)

Ancient Hebrew texts
Bible translations into Aramaic
Bible versions and translations
Biblical commentaries
Biblical exegesis
Books about the Bible
Hebrew Bible
Hebrew Bible studies
Hebrew Bible versions and translations
Hebrew Bible words and phrases
Jewish education
Jewish law
Jewish prayer and ritual texts
Jewish texts
Jewish texts in Aramaic
Law of Moses
Midrashim
Rabbinic Judaism
Rabbinic legal texts and responsa
Rabbinic literature
Religious books
Sifrei Kodesh
Talmud
Targums
Torah
Torah study